Lee Cheol-ho (Hangul:이철호; born 20 September 1986) is a South Korean badminton player. In 2004, he reach the semi-final round in the boys' singles event at the Richmond World Junior Championships and Hwacheon Asian Junior Championships and settle for the bronze medal. At the senior event, he won the 2006 India Satellite, 2009 Osaka International Challenge and 2015 Apacs Mongolia International Series tournament.

Achievements

IBF World Junior Championships
Boys' singles

Asian Junior Championships
Boys' singles

BWF International Challenge/Series
Men's singles

Men's doubles

 BWF International Challenge tournament
 BWF International Series tournament
 BWF Future Series tournament

References

External links 
 

1986 births
Living people
South Korean male badminton players